Hakusanobaatar is an extinct genus of eobaatarid multituberculate which existed in Japan, during the early Cretaceous.

References

Cretaceous mammals
Multituberculates
Fossil taxa described in 2008
Fossils of Japan
Prehistoric mammal genera